James Yurichuk (born November 1, 1986, in Brampton, Ontario) is a former Canadian professional football linebacker and businessman. He was drafted by the BC Lions in the 2009 CFL Draft in the first round and played four seasons with the BC Lions, winning the Grey Cup in 2011 with the Lions. He played CIS football for the Bishop's Gaiters. Yurichuk is also the founder and CEO of Wuxly Outerwear.

Professional career

BC Lions
Yurichuk was drafted by the BC Lions in the first round of the 2009 CFL Draft. He played primarily on special teams in the 2009 BC Lions season and was among the league leaders in special teams tackles. His dribbled ball kick that led to a Lions touchdown in week 6 was considered the turning point of the game and demonstrated his knowledge of Canadian football rules. Yurichuk played in his first Grey Cup game in 2011 where he recorded two special teams tackles in the 99th Grey Cup victory over the Winnipeg Blue Bombers. He played in 72 regular season games for the Lions, starting in seven, where he had 42 defensive tackles, 61 special teams tackles, and three interceptions.

Toronto Argonauts
On February 15, 2013, the first day of CFL free agency, Yurichuk signed with the Toronto Argonauts. He earned the Jake Gaudaur Veterans' Trophy in 2014. He played in four seasons for the Argonauts where he dressed in 72 games, starting in five, and recorded 38 defensive tackles, 61 special teams tackles, and one interception. He became a free agent upon the expiry of his contract on February 14, 2017.

References

External links 
Bishop's Gaiters bio
Toronto Argonauts bio 
BC Lions bio

1986 births
Living people
Bishop's Gaiters football players
Canadian football linebackers
Players of Canadian football from Ontario
Toronto Argonauts